Magnetogenetics refers to a biological technique that involves the use of magnetic fields to remotely control cell activity.

In most cases, magnetic stimulation is transformed into either force (magneto-mechanical genetics) or heat (magneto-thermal genetics), which depends on the applied magnetic field. Therefore, cells are usually genetically modified to express ion channels that are either mechanically or thermally gated. As such, magnetogenetics is a cellular modulation method that uses a combination of techniques from magnetism and genetics to control activities of individual cells in living tissue – even within freely moving animals and people.  This technique is comparable to optogenetics, which is the manipulation of cell behavior using light. In magnetogenetics, magnetic stimulation is used instead of light, a characteristic that allows for a less invasive, less toxic, and wireless modulation of cell activity.

Cell activity control is achieved using magnetic compounds such as ferritin or magnetic nanoparticles. These compounds are designed to link to the ion channels that are genetically expressed on specific cells. Control of activity is thus restricted to genetically pre-defined cells and performed in a spatiotemporal-specific manner by magnetic stimulation.

History 
The development of genetic technologies that can modulate cellular processes has greatly contributed to biological research. A representative example is the development of optogenetics, which is a neuromodulation tool kit that involves light-sensitive proteins such as opsins. This progress provided the grounds for a breakthrough in linking the causal relationship between neuronal activity and behavioral outcome.

The foremost strength of the genetic toolkits used in neuromodulation is that it can provide either spatially or temporally, or both, precise modulation of the brain nervous system. To date, several technologies are adapted with genetics (e.g. optogenetics, chemogenetics, etc.), and each technology has strengths and limits. For example, optogenetics has advantages in that it can provide temporally and spatially precise manipulation of neurons. On the other hand, it involves light stimulation, which cannot penetrate tissues effectively and requires implanted optical devices, limiting its applications for in vivo live animal studies

Techniques that rely on the magnetic control of cellular process are relatively new. This technique may provide an approach that does not require implantation of invasive electrodes or optical devices. This method will allow penetration in to the deeper region of the brain, and may have lower response latency. In 1980, Young and colleagues have shown that magnetic fields with magnitudes in millitesla range are able to penetrate into the brain without attenuation of the signal or side effects because of the negligible magnetic susceptibility and low conductivity of biological tissue. Early attempts to manipulate electrical signaling within brain using magnetic fields was performed by Baker et al., who later developed devices for transcranial magnetic stimulation (TMS) in 1985.

To apply magnetogenetics in biological and neuroscientific research, fusing TRPV class receptors with a paramagnetic protein (typically ferritin) was suggested. These paramagnetic proteins, which typically contain iron or have iron-containing cofactors, are then magnetically stimulated. How this technique can modulate neuronal activity remains unclear but it is thought that the ion channels are activated and opened either by mechanical force exerted by the paramagnetic proteins, or by heating of these via magnetic stimulation. However, availability of such paramagnetic proteins as a transducer for magnetic field to mechanical or temperature stimuli is controversial.

On the other hand, nanoparticles have been suggested as possible candidates that can function as the transducer of magnetic field to the stimulus cue. Based on this concept, next generation of magnetogenetics technique is being developed. In 2010, Arnd Pralle and colleges showed that the first in vivo magneto-thermal stimulation of heat sensitive ion channel TRPV1 that employs magnetic nanoparticles as a transducer in C. elegans. In 2015, Polina Anikeeva’s research group demonstrated that similar concept can enhance the neuronal signals in mammalian brain. In 2021, Jinwoo Cheon’s research group has successfully developed the magneto-mechanical genetics which uses magnetic stimulation derived mechanical force in mammalian. In this study, magnetic torque by rotating magnetic field was employed to activate the mechanosensitive cation channel Piezo1. Results of this study show that remote, in vivo manipulation of behavior of mice can be done using magnetogenetics.

Technique 
There are many ways to utilize magnetogenetics in research. One of the main challenges of magnetogenetics is in introducing the magnetic component into a specific system (i.e. protein or cells) or regions (e.g. mouse brain region) of the organism in question.  One approach involves synthesizing the fusion protein of ion channels with iron containing proteins such as ferritins to synthesize the magnetic component in the biological system itself (i.e. neurons). Another method is to use magnetic nanoparticles such as iron oxide, synthesized outside of the biosystems, and design the particle so that it will specifically bind to target ion channels.

The working mechanism of magnetogenetics can be classified by how magnetic stimulation is mediated to activate bio systems, such as ion channels. Heat mediated (magneto-thermal genetics) activation and force mediated activation (magneto-mechanical genetics) are two main categories of magnetogenetics. In magneto-mechanical genetics, pulling force (e.g. magnetic tweezers) and torque force are commonly used to mechanically open ion channels in cells and in neurons.

Heat mediated activation 
The superparamagnetic nanocomposites generate thermal energy under alternating magnetic fields. This process is closely related to the Neel relaxation theory of magnetic energy. Generated heat from magnetic nanocomposites is generally used for the magnetic hyperthermia. In magnetogenetics, the temperature increase caused by magnetic nanocomposites activate the genetically modified neurons via gating of thermosensitive ion channels (e.g. TRPV1).

Force mediated activation

Pulling force 
In the gradient magnetic field, magnetic objects are attracted to the magnetic field region with relatively stronger magnetic force. The force of this magnetic pulling depends on the equation of force between magnets. This force traps the biomolecules on the cell membrane to make cluster of proteins or changes the conformation of proteins which initiate the cascade of cell signaling.

Torque 
When the magnetization axis of magnetic particles is not aligned with external magnetic field, the magnetic particles will involuntarily continue to rotate to align with the axis. This rotating motion is the origin of the magnetic torque. The torque of the magnetic particles is proportional to the magnetic moment of the particles and external magnetic fields. The magnetic particles that are bound to the target proteins generate rotating movements in the rotating or alternating magnetic field, inducing desired cell signaling or ion channel gating of mechanosensitive ion channels such as Piezo1.

Issues

Physical limitation of the ferritin 

One of the main issues in magnetogenetics is related the physical properties of the ferritin. The ferritin is composed of 24 subunits of protein complex and a small iron oxide core. The core of the ferritin is in the form of ferric hydroxide which has antiferromagnetic properties. Some researchers have reported that ferritin has remnant magnetization due to their intrinsic defect and impurities. However, even with optimistic calculations, the magnetic interaction energy for heat or force generation is several orders below than thermal fluctuation energy. Recently, other researchers hypothesized that there are other possible mechanisms for activate the ion channels, but these studies remain inconclusive.

Efforts to overcome the physical limits 
There has been attempts to overcome these intrinsic physical limits of the ferritin. One approach is the use of magnetic nanoparticles which are composed of high magnetic moment such as Fe3O4. The iron oxide magnetic nanoparticles can generate sufficient heat or force with appropriate nanoengineering such as tuning the composites, doping atoms or structures. Another attempt involves using higher hierarchical structure of nanocomposites. Researchers assembled the nanocomposites such as iron oxide nanoparticles or iron storage proteins to make the architectures with higher magnetic moment.

Application 
The field of magnetogenetics is a relatively new area of research that has the possibility to further the scientific understanding of how specific cells and genes contribute to the function of biological tissues such as neural circuits in vivo. It also has great potential for clinical applications as many medical tools that utilize magnetic fields such as MRI, and TMS are already in use in patients.

Remote control of gene transcription 
Magnetogenetic techniques involve TRPV class receptors, which are selective calcium transporters, with magnetic nanoparticles or paramagnetic proteins (typically ferratin). The use of magnetic nanoparticles or paramagnetic proteins heated by a alternating magnetic field can stimulate the temperature-sensitive ion channel TRPV1. When the local temperature rises, TRPV1 gates Ca2+ to initiate the synthesis and release of bioengineered insulin driven by a Ca2+ sensitive promoter. This method for remote regulation of gene transcription can be applied to basic research and potential therapeutic approaches for gene therapy.

Wireless control of neuronal activity 

The currently available magnetogenetics techniques combine targeted magnetic particle delivery with magnetic stimulation. This allows for the accurate spatial control of the targeted intervention (i.e. inhibition or excitation of the target neurons in target brain regions). The temporal precision seems to vary depending on the threshold of ion channels, and the frequency, and the intensity of the stimulation. Experiments can be devised where the magnetic stimulation triggers some sort of cellular (in vitro) or behavioral (in vivo) response.  A U.S. patent awarded to Henricus Loos specifies that such experiments are envisioned to be utilized in animal control, noting that "The nervous system of mammals is similar to that of humans, so that sensory resonances are expected to exist."That and other patents, Loos notes, suggest that magnetogenetics can be used to induce sleep, sexual arousal, vertigo and reduction of cognitive processes, suggesting that not all uses of the invention may be strictly benevolent medical interventions.

Motor cortex 
Magnetogenetics, freely moving mammalian behavior, and immunohistochemistry have been integrated to investigate the efficacy and validity of magnetogenetics as a neuroscientific tool. Magnetogenetic activation of the mice motor cortex has been shown to be effective in inducing locomotor changes in freely moving mice. The torque mediated magnetogenetics is a new tool kit established by Lee and colleagues that can transduce magnetic stimulation into mechanical torque for untethered neuromodulation at a long distance. In this study, scientists incorporated Piezo1, a mechanosensitive cation channel to endow mechanosensitivity to neurons. Piezo1 is genetically expressed in the motor cortex via viral injection. After the expression of this ion channel, magnetic nanocomposites are injected into the same location. The nanoparticles generate and deliver the torque to the Piezo1 ion channel to stimulate specific neurons. The electrical signals are propagated through the neuron network and change the behavior of live animal.

References 

Genetics
Magnetism